Patrick McLaughlin is the name of:

 Paddy McLaughlin (footballer, born 1979), Northern Irish footballer and manager
 Paddy McLaughlin (footballer, born 1991), Northern Irish footballer
 Pat McLaughlin, singer-songwriter
 Pat McLaughlin (baseball) (1910–1999), American baseball player
 Pat McLaughlin (footballer) (1883–1916), English footballer
 Patrick McLaughlin (churchman) (1909–1988), English Anglican priest and later Roman Catholic lay brother
 Patrick McLaughlin (criminal) (1822–1858), New York City immigrant runner and bodyguard
 Patrick McLaughlin, alias of Scottish serial killer Peter Tobin (1946–2022)

See also 
 Patrick McLoughlin (disambiguation)